Carlos Coloma Nicolás (born 28 September 1981) is a Spanish cross-country mountain biker. At the 2012 Summer Olympics, he competed in the Men's cross-country at Hadleigh Farm, finishing in 6th place. He improved this result four years later at the 2016 Summer Olympics, where he finished third, behind Nino Schurter and Jaroslav Kulhavý, and won the bronze medal. He was on the start list for the 2018 Cross-country European Championship and he finished.

Olympic results

Achievements

2016
  3rd place at Olympic Games (Rio de Janeiro, Brazil)
  1st place at Spanish Mountain Bike National Championships (Maceda, Spain)

2005
  1st place at Spanish Mountain Bike National Championships (Vilaboa, Spain)

2003
  2nd place (U23) at European Mountain Bike Championships (Graz, Austria)
  3rd place (Mixed relay) at European Mountain Bike Championships (Graz, Austria)

2001
  3rd place (Mixed relay) at UCI Mountain Bike World Championships (Vail, United States)

1999
  2nd place (Junior) at UCI Mountain Bike World Championships (Åre, Sweden)
  1st place (Mixed relay) at UCI Mountain Bike World Championships (Åre, Sweden)

References

Spanish male cyclists
Cross-country mountain bikers
1981 births
Living people
Olympic cyclists of Spain
Cyclists at the 2008 Summer Olympics
Cyclists at the 2012 Summer Olympics
Cyclists at the 2016 Summer Olympics
Sportspeople from Logroño
Cyclists at the 2015 European Games
European Games competitors for Spain
Olympic bronze medalists for Spain
Cyclists from La Rioja (Spain)